Bromley is a district of south east London, England, historically a market town in Kent.

Bromley may also refer to:

People 
 Bromley (surname)

Places

United Kingdom
 The London Borough of Bromley, a local government district in London, named after  the town of Bromley
 Bromley-by-Bow, a district of east London in the London Borough of Tower Hamlets 
 Abbots Bromley, a village in East Staffordshire
 Bromley Cross, an area of the Metropolitan Borough of Bolton, Greater Manchester
 Great Bromley, a village in Essex
 Little Bromley, a village in Essex
 Bromley, South Yorkshire, a hamlet in the parish of Wortley, in the Metropolitan Borough of Barnsley
 Bromley, West Midlands, a village in the Black Country
 Bromley Heath, in Gloucestershire, an outer suburb of Bristol

United States
 Bromley, Alabama, an unincorporated community in Baldwin County
 Bromley, Kentucky, a town in the US state of Kentucky
 Bromley Mountain, a mountain in the US state of Vermont
 Bromley, Vermont, the original name of the town of Peru, Vermont

Other
 Bromley, New Zealand, a suburb of Christchurch
 Bromley, Zimbabwe, a village in Zimbabwe
 Bromley Rock Provincial Park, British Columbia, Canada
 Admaston/Bromley, Ontario, Canada

Other uses
 Bromley Contingent, a Sex Pistols fan group
 Bromley equation, an equation for calculating activity coefficients for electrolytes in aqueous solution
 Bromley F.C., the football club from the town of Bromley, England
 Bromley, a childhood friend of Prince Derek in The Swan Princess trilogy.

See also 
 Bramley (disambiguation)